Kavarskas, with a population of only 700, is the fourth smallest city in Lithuania. The Šventoji River flows through the town. In 1956 near Kavarskas a water lifting station was built and part of the Šventoji River's water was channeled to the Nevėžis River. Nowadays there is a water-power plant operating there.

History
Where the modern town is today located, in the 15th century there was the Mažieji Pienionys (Little Pienionys) estate. At the end of the 15th century, the Grand Duke of Lithuania Alexander Jagiellon transferred the estate to Stanislovas Kovarskis, the treasurer of the king. As he had no successors, the estate was inherited by his brother, Andrius Kovarskis, the canon of the Vilnius Cathedral. Thus, the name of the Little Pienionys estate was changed to Kavarskas.

In written sources, Kavarskas was first mentioned in 1538. In that year, a church was built. In the 16th century, Kavarskas and the surrounding area belonged to nobles Astikai, later – Ogiński (Oginskiai), Tyszkiewicz (Tiškevičiai), and Siesickiai.

During the summer of 1941, the Jewish population was murdered in a mass execution perpetrated by Germans and Lithuanian nationalists.

In 1956, Kavarskas was granted town rights.

References

Cities in Lithuania
Cities in Utena County
Vilkomirsky Uyezd
Anykščiai District Municipality
Holocaust locations in Lithuania